The 2009 San Diego Padres season was the 41st season in franchise history.

Regular season

Season standings

Record vs. opponents

Roster

Game log 
During the Padres 6-5 win over the New York Mets at Citi Field on April 13, 2009, Jody Gerut became the first player to open a new ballpark with a leadoff home run, hitting the first base hit and home run on the 3rd pitch off Mets starting pitcher Mike Pelfrey.

|-  bgcolor="ffbbbb"
|- align="center" bgcolor="ffbbbb"
| 1 || April 6 || Dodgers || 4–1 || Kuroda (1–0) || Peavy (0–1) || Broxton (1) || 45,496 || 0–1
|- align="center" bgcolor="bbffbb"
| 2 || April 7 || Dodgers || 4–2 || Young (1–0) || Wolf (0–1) || Bell (1) || 20,035 || 1–1
|- align="center" bgcolor="ffbbbb"
| 3 || April 8 || Dodgers || 5–2 || Billingsley (1–0) || Mujica (0–1) || Broxton (2) || 31,700 || 1–2
|- align="center" bgcolor="bbffbb"
| 4 || April 9 || Dodgers || 4–3 || Meredith (1–0) || Wade (0–1) || Bell (2) || 29,710 || 2–2
|- align="center" bgcolor="bbffbb"
| 5 || April 10 || Giants || 7–3 || Hill (1–0) || Zito (0–1) || || 20,507 || 3–2
|- align="center" bgcolor="bbffbb"
| 6 || April 11 || Giants || 6–3 || Peavy (1–1) || Sánchez (0–1) || Bell (3) || 35,305 || 4–2
|- align="center" bgcolor="bbffbb"
| 7 || April 12 || Giants || 6–1 || Young (2–0) || Lincecum (0–1) || || 19,415 || 5–2
|- align="center" bgcolor="bbffbb"
| 8 || April 13 || @ Mets || 6–5 || Mujica (1–1) || Stokes (0–1) || Bell (4) || 41,007 || 6–2
|- align="center" bgcolor="ffbbbb"
| 9 || April 15 || @ Mets || 7–2 || Pérez (1–1) || Correia (0–1) || || 35,581 || 6–3
|- align="center" bgcolor="bbffbb"
| 10 || April 16 || @ Mets || 6–5 || Peavy (2–1) || Maine (0–1) || Bell (5) || 35,985 || 7–3
|- align="center" bgcolor="bbffbb"
| 11 || April 17 || @ Phillies || 8–7 || Meredith (2–0) || Madson (1–1) || Bell (6) || 44,984 || 8–3
|- align="center" bgcolor="bbffbb"
| 12 || April 18 || @ Phillies || 8–5 || Meredith (3–0) || Lidge (0–1) || Bell (7) || 45,007 || 9–3
|- align="center" bgcolor="ffbbbb"
| 13 || April 19 || @ Phillies || 5–4 || Condrey (2–0) || Moreno (0–1) || || 45,266 || 9–4
|- align="center" bgcolor="bbbbbb"
| || April 20  || @ Phillies || colspan=6 |Postponed
|- align="center" bgcolor="ffbbbb"
| 14 || April 21 || @ Giants || 8–3 || Cain (2–0) || Peavy (2–2) || || 39,314 || 9–5
|- align="center" bgcolor="ffbbbb"
| 15 || April 22 || @ Giants || 1–0 (10) || Wilson (1–0) || Moreno (0–2) || || 26,593 || 9–6
|- align="center" bgcolor="bbffbb"
| 16 || April 24 || Pirates || 4–3 (11) || Moreno (1–2) || Capps (0–1) || || 25,601 || 10–6
|- align="center" bgcolor="ffbbbb"
| 17 || April 25 || Pirates || 10–1 || Duke (3–1) || Hill (1–1) || || 41,665 || 10–7
|- align="center" bgcolor="ffbbbb"
| 18 || April 26 || Pirates || 8–3 || Ohlendorf (2–2) || Peavy (2–3) || || 30,848 || 10–8
|- align="center" bgcolor="ffbbbb"
| 19 || April 27 || @ Rockies || 12–7 || Grilli (1–1) || Young (2–1) || || 18,246 || 10–9
|- align="center" bgcolor="bbffbb"
| 20 || April 28 || @ Rockies || 4–3 || Sánchez (1–0) || Corpas (0–2) || Bell (8) || 19,346 || 11–9
|- align="center" bgcolor="ffbbbb"
| 21 || April 29 || @ Rockies || 7–5 || Cook (1–1) || Correia (0–2) || Street (2) || 20,289 || 11–10
|- align="center" bgcolor="ffbbbb"
| 22 || April 30 || @ Dodgers || 8–5 || Belisario (1–2) || Gregerson (0–1) || Broxton (7) || 54,628 || 11–11
|-

|-  bgcolor="ffbbbb"
|- align="center" bgcolor="ffbbbb"
| 23 || May 1 || @ Dodgers || 1–0 || Broxton (3–0) || Sánchez (1–1) || || 47,210 || 11–12
|- align="center" bgcolor="ffbbbb"
| 24 || May 2 || @ Dodgers || 2–1 (10) || Mota (2–0) || Gregerson (0–2) || || 47,680 || 11–13
|- align="center" bgcolor="ffbbbb"
| 25 || May 3 || @ Dodgers || 7–3 || Billingsley (5–0) || Gaudin (0–1) || || 52,096 || 11–14
|- align="center" bgcolor="ffbbbb"
| 26 || May 4 || Rockies || 9–6 || Rusch (1–0) || Moreno (1–3) || Street (3) || 14,717 || 11–15
|- align="center" bgcolor="bbffbb"
| 27 || May 5 || Rockies || 2–1 (10) || Bell (1–0) || Daley (0–1) || || 13,646 || 12–15
|- align="center" bgcolor="ffbbbb"
| 28 || May 6 || Diamondbacks || 3–1 || Garland (3–1) || Peavy (2–4) || Qualls (7) || 15,092 || 12–16
|- align="center" bgcolor="bbffbb"
| 29 || May 7 || Diamondbacks || 4–3 (10) || Meredith (4–0) || Vásquez (0–1) || || 18,921 || 13–16
|- align="center" bgcolor="ffbbbb"
| 30 || May 8 || @ Astros || 2–0 || Rodríguez (3–2) || Gaudin (0–2) || Hawkins (4) || 28,139 || 13–17
|- align="center" bgcolor="ffbbbb"
| 31 || May 9 || @ Astros || 5–4 || Hawkins (1–0) || Gregerson (0–3) || || 29,141 || 13–18
|- align="center" bgcolor="ffbbbb"
| 32 || May 10 || @ Astros || 12–5 || Oswalt (1–2) || Geer (0–1) || || 30,023 || 13–19
|- align="center" bgcolor="ffbbbb"
| 33 || May 12 || @ Cubs || 6–2 || Harden (4–1) || Peavy (2–5) || || 39,963 || 13–20
|- align="center" bgcolor="ffbbbb"
| 34 || May 13 || @ Cubs || 6–4 (8) || Lilly (5–2) || Young (2–2) || Mármol (3) || 38,410 || 13–21
|- align="center" bgcolor="ffbbbb"
| 35 || May 14 || @ Cubs || 11–3 || Dempster (3–2) || Gaudin (0–3) || || 39,728 || 13–22
|- align="center" bgcolor="bbffbb"
| 36 || May 15 || Reds || 5–3 || Correia (1–2) || Harang (3–4) || Bell (9) || 27,021 || 14–22
|- align="center" bgcolor="bbffbb"
| 37 || May 16 || Reds || 6–5 (16) || Perdomo (1–0) || Owings (3–4) || || 31,001 || 15–22
|- align="center" bgcolor="bbffbb"
| 38 || May 17 || Reds || 3–1 || Peavy (3–5) || Arroyo (5–3) || || 21,123 || 16–22
|- align="center" bgcolor="bbffbb"
| 39 || May 19 || Giants || 2–1 || Young (3–2) || Zito (1–4) || Bell (10) || 16,175 || 17–22
|- align="center" bgcolor="bbffbb"
| 40 || May 20 || Giants || 2–1 || Gaudin (1–3) || Sánchez (1–4) || Bell (11) || 15,208 || 18–22
|- align="center" bgcolor="bbffbb"
| 41 || May 21 || Giants || 3–2 || Bell (2–0) || Wilson (2–3) || || 19,921 || 19–22
|- align="center" bgcolor="bbffbb"
| 42 || May 22 || Cubs || 4–0 || Peavy (4–5) || Zambrano (3–2) || Bell (12) || 27,260 || 20–22
|- align="center" bgcolor="bbffbb"
| 43 || May 23 || Cubs || 3–1 || Geer (1–1) || Wells (0–1) || Mujica (1) || 37,798 || 21–22
|- align="center" bgcolor="bbffbb"
| 44 || May 24 || Cubs || 7–2 || Young (4–2) || Lilly (5–4) || || 39,593 || 22–22
|- align="center" bgcolor="bbffbb"
| 45 || May 25 || @ Diamondbacks || 9–7 (10) || Mujica (2–1) || Peña (4–2) || Bell (13) || 30,546 || 23–22
|- align="center" bgcolor="ffbbbb"
| 46 || May 26 || @ Diamondbacks || 6–5 || Scherzer (2–3) || Correia (1–3) || Gutiérrez (1) || 18,631 || 23–23
|- align="center" bgcolor="bbffbb"
| 47 || May 27 || @ Diamondbacks || 8–5 || Peavy (5–5) || Buckner (1–1) || Bell (14) || 18,264 || 24–23
|- align="center" bgcolor="ffbbbb"
| 48 || May 29 || @ Rockies || 3–0 || Marquis (7–3) || Young (4–3) || Street (8) || 23,239 || 24–24
|- align="center" bgcolor="ffbbbb"
| 49 || May 30 || @ Rockies || 8–7 || Street (1–1) || Bell (2–1) || || 32,064 || 24–25
|- align="center" bgcolor="bbffbb"
| 50 || May 31 || @ Rockies || 5–2 || Gaudin (2–3) || de la Rosa (0–6) || Bell (15) || 30,223 || 25–25
|-

|-  bgcolor="ffbbbb"
|- align="center" bgcolor="ffbbbb"
| 51 || June 1 || Phillies || 5–3 || Blanton (4–3) || Correia (1–4) || Lidge (13) || 22,825 || 25–26
|- align="center" bgcolor="ffbbbb"
| 52 || June 2 || Phillies || 10–5 || Bastardo (1–0) || Peavy (5–6) || Madson (2) || 17,625 || 25–27
|- align="center" bgcolor="ffbbbb"
| 53 || June 3 || Phillies || 5–1 || Happ (4–0) || Young (4–4) || || 15,436 || 25–28
|- align="center" bgcolor="ffbbbb"
| 54 || June 5 || Diamondbacks || 8–0 || Davis (3–6) || Gaudin (2–4) || || 22,426 || 25–29
|- align="center" bgcolor="bbffbb"
| 55 || June 6 || Diamondbacks || 6–4 || Correia (2–4) || Schlereth (0–2) || Bell (16) || 23,592 || 26–29
|- align="center" bgcolor="ffbbbb"
| 56 || June 7 || Diamondbacks || 9–6 (18) || Rosales (1–0) || Wilson (0–1) || || 27,804 || 26–30
|- align="center" bgcolor="bbffbb"
| 57 || June 8 || Diamondbacks || 6–3 || Peavy (6–6) || Garland (4–6) || Bell (17) || 17,501 || 27–30
|- align="center" bgcolor="ffbbbb"
| 58 || June 9 || @ Dodgers || 6–4 || Billingsley (8–3) || Young (4–5) || Broxton (14) || 35,313 || 27–31
|- align="center" bgcolor="bbffbb"
| 59 || June 10 || @ Dodgers || 3–1 || Correia (3–4) || Kershaw (3–5) || Bell (18) || 44,079 || 28–31
|- align="center" bgcolor="ffbbbb"
| 60 || June 12 || @ Angels || 11–6 || Palmer (6–0) || Gaudin (2–5) || || 41,597 || 28–32
|- align="center" bgcolor="ffbbbb"
| 61 || June 13 || @ Angels || 9–1 || Saunders (7–4) || Geer (1–2) || || 43,233 || 28–33
|- align="center" bgcolor="ffbbbb"
| 62 || June 14 || @ Angels || 6–0 || Weaver (7–2) || Young (4–6) || || 40,163 || 28–34
|- align="center" bgcolor="ffbbbb"
| 63 || June 16 || Mariners || 5–0 || Hernández (7–3) || Correia (3–5) || || 17,040 || 28–35
|- align="center" bgcolor="ffbbbb"
| 64 || June 17 || Mariners || 4–3 || Olson (2–1) || Gaudin (2–6) || Aardsma (12) || 20,224 || 28–36
|- align="center" bgcolor="bbffbb"
| 65 || June 18 || Mariners || 4–3 || Bell (3–1) || Batista (3–2) || || 25,146 || 29–36
|- align="center" bgcolor="ffbbbb"
| 66 || June 19 || Athletics || 7–5 || Wuertz (3–1) || Mujica (2–2) || Bailey (7) || 20,019 || 29–37
|- align="center" bgcolor="ffbbbb"
| 67 || June 20 || Athletics || 6–3 || Wuertz (4–1) || Meredith (4–1) || Bailey (8) || 28,074 || 29–38
|- align="center" bgcolor="bbffbb"
| 68 || June 21 || Athletics || 4–1 || Correia (4–5) || Braden (5–6) || Bell (19) || 27,249 || 30–38
|- align="center" bgcolor="bbffbb"
| 69 || June 23 || @ Mariners || 9–7 || Gaudin (3–6) || Olson (2–2) || Bell (20) || 23,537 || 31–38
|- align="center" bgcolor="ffbbbb"
| 70 || June 24 || @ Mariners || 4–3 || White (2–0) || Mujica (2–3) || Aardsma (15) || 22,988 || 31–39
|- align="center" bgcolor="ffbbbb"
| 71 || June 25 || @ Mariners || 9–3 || Washburn (4–5) || LeBlanc (0–1) || || 27,968 || 31–40
|- align="center" bgcolor="ffbbbb"
| 72 || June 26 || @ Rangers || 12–2 || Millwood (8–5) || Silva (0–1) || || 33,340 || 31–41
|- align="center" bgcolor="bbffbb"
| 73 || June 27 || @ Rangers || 7–3 || Correia (5–5) || Holland (1–5) || || 25,410 || 32–41
|- align="center" bgcolor="bbffbb"
| 74 || June 28 || @ Rangers || 2–0 || Gaudin (4–6) || Hunter (0–1) || Bell (21) || 27,000 || 33–41
|- align="center" bgcolor="ffbbbb"
| 75 || June 29 || Astros || 3–1 || Oswalt (4–4) || Geer (1–3) || || 15,671 || 33–42
|- align="center" bgcolor="bbffbb"
| 76 || June 30 || Astros || 4–3 || Banks (1–0) || Sampson (4–1) || Bell (22) || 15,276 || 34–42
|-

|-  bgcolor="ffbbbb"
|- align="center" bgcolor="ffbbbb"
| 77 || July 1 || Astros || 7–1 || Moehler (5–4) || Silva (0–2) || || 16,670 || 34–43
|- align="center" bgcolor="ffbbbb"
| 78 || July 2 || Astros || 7–2 || Rodríguez (7–6) || Correia (5–6) || || 23,284 || 34–44
|- align="center" bgcolor="ffbbbb"
| 79 || July 3 || Dodgers || 6–3 || Kuroda (3–4) || Gaudin (4–7) || Broxton (20) || 42,217 || 34–45
|- align="center" bgcolor="bbffbb"
| 80 || July 4 || Dodgers || 7–4 || Burke (1–0) || Belisario (1–3) || Bell (23) || 42,069 || 35–45
|- align="center" bgcolor="ffbbbb"
| 81 || July 5 || Dodgers || 7–6 || Weaver (5–2) || Mujica (2–4) || || 30,070 || 35–46
|- align="center" bgcolor="ffbbbb"
| 82 || July 6 || @ Diamondbacks || 6–5 || Rauch (1–0) || Meredith (4–2) || || 17,528 || 35–47
|- align="center" bgcolor="ffbbbb"
| 83 || July 7 || @ Diamondbacks || 4–3 || Davis (4–8) || Correia (5–7) || Qualls (16) || 18,619 || 35–48
|- align="center" bgcolor="ffbbbb"
| 84 || July 8 || @ Diamondbacks || 6–2 || Zavada (2–2) || Burke (1–1) || || 20,791 || 35–49
|- align="center" bgcolor="ffbbbb"
| 85 || July 9 || @ Giants || 9–3 || Lincecum (10–2) || Geer (1–4) || || 33,508 || 35–50
|- align="center" bgcolor="ffbbbb"
| 86 || July 10 || @ Giants || 8–0 || Sánchez (3–8) || Banks (1–1) || || 30,298 || 35–51
|- align="center" bgcolor="ffbbbb"
| 87 || July 11 || @ Giants || 2–1 || Miller (2–1) || Stauffer (0–1) || Wilson (23) || 38,112 || 35–52
|- align="center" bgcolor="bbffbb"
| 88 || July 12 || @ Giants || 10–4 || Correia (6–7) || Zito (5–9) || || 41,913 || 36–52
|- align="center" bgcolor="ffbbbb"
| 89 || July 16 || Rockies || 10–1 || Cook (9–3) || Gaudin (4–8) || || 22,758 || 36–53
|- align="center" bgcolor="ffbbbb"
| 90 || July 17 || Rockies || 5–3 || Jiménez (7–9) || Geer (1–5) || Street (23) || 21,887 || 36–54
|- align="center" bgcolor="bbffbb"
| 91 || July 18 || Rockies || 3–1 || Burke (2–1) || Peralta (0–3) || Bell (24) || 28,652 || 37–54
|- align="center" bgcolor="ffbbbb"
| 92 || July 19 || Rockies || 6–1 || Marquis (12–6) || Latos (0–1) || || 20,747 || 37–55
|- align="center" bgcolor="ffbbbb"
| 93 || July 20 || Marlins || 3–2 || VandenHurk (1–0) || Burke (2–2) || Núñez (5) || 17,184 ||37–56
|- align="center" bgcolor="ffbbbb"
| 94 || July 21 || Marlins  || 3–2 || Volstad (7–9) || Gaudin (4–9) || Núñez (6) || 20,311 ||37–57
|- align="center" bgcolor="ffbbbb"
| 95 || July 22 || Marlins || 5–0 || Nolasco (7–7) || Geer (1–6) || || 16,450 ||37–58
|- align="center" bgcolor="ffbbbb"
| 96 || July 23 || @ Phillies || 9–4 || Hamels (6–5) || Correia (6–8) || || 45,242 ||37–59
|- align="center" bgcolor="bbffbb"
| 97 || July 24 || @ Nationals || 6–2 || Latos (1–1) || Mock (0–4) || || 23,506 ||38–59
|- align="center" bgcolor="ffbbbb"
| 98 || July 25 || @ Nationals || 13–1 || Clippard (1–0) || Stauffer (0–2) || || 21,834 ||38–60
|- align="center" bgcolor="ffbbbb"
| 99 || July 26 || @ Nationals || 3–2 || Beimel (1–5) || Burke (2–3) || || 20,747 ||38–61
|- align="center" bgcolor="ffbbbb"
| 100 || July 27 || @ Reds || 6–4 || Bailey (2–2) || Geer (1–7) || Cordero (23) || 18,563 ||38–62
|- align="center" bgcolor="bbffbb"
| 101 || July 28 || @ Reds || 3–2 ||  ||  || || 14,526 ||39–62
|- align="center" bgcolor="bbffbb"
| 102 || July 29 || @ Reds || 7–1 ||  ||  || || 17,201 ||40–62
|- align="center" bgcolor="bbffbb"
| 103 || July 30 || @ Reds || 7–4 ||  ||  || || 19,117 ||41–62
|- align="center" bgcolor="bbffbb"
| 104 || July 31 || Brewers || 11–7 ||  ||  || || 32,588 ||42–62
|-

|-  bgcolor="ffbbbb"
|- align="center" bgcolor="bbffbb"
| 105 || August 1 || Brewers || 4–2 ||  ||  || || 26,424 ||43–62
|- align="center" bgcolor="ffbbbb"
| 106 || August 2 || Brewers || 6–1 ||  ||  || || 23,696 ||43–63
|- align="center" bgcolor="bbffbb"
| 107 || August 3 || Braves || 4–2 ||  ||  || || 20,423 ||44–63
|- align="center" bgcolor="ffbbbb"
| 108 || August 4 || Braves || 9–2 ||  ||  || || 17,916 ||44–64
|- align="center" bgcolor="ffbbbb"
| 109 || August 5 || Braves || 6–2 ||  ||  || || 21,816 ||44–65
|- align="center" bgcolor="bbffbb"
| 110 || August 6 || Mets || 8–3 ||  ||  || || 18,880 ||45–65
|- align="center" bgcolor="bbffbb"
| 111 || August 7 || Mets || 6–2 ||  ||  || || 23,038 ||46–65
|- align="center" bgcolor="bbffbb"
| 112 || August 8 || Mets || 3–1 ||  ||  || || 35,184 ||47–65
|- align="center" bgcolor="ffbbbb"
| 113 || August 9 || Mets || 5–1 ||  ||  || || 27,754 ||47–66
|- align="center" bgcolor="bbffbb"
| 114 || August 11 || @ Brewers || 13–6 ||  ||  || || 37,040 ||48–66
|- align="center" bgcolor="bbffbb"
| 115 || August 12 || @ Brewers || 6–5 ||  ||  || || 38,753 ||49–66
|- align="center" bgcolor="ffbbbb"
| 116 || August 13 || @ Brewers || 12–9 ||  ||  || || 39,683 ||49–67
|- align="center" bgcolor="ffbbbb"
| 117 || August 14 || @ Cardinals || 9–2 ||  ||  || || 42,208 ||49–68
|- align="center" bgcolor="ffbbbb"
| 118 || August 15 || @ Cardinals || 7–4 ||  ||  || || 44,292 ||49–69
|- align="center" bgcolor="ffbbbb"
| 119 || August 16 || @ Cardinals || 7–5 ||  ||  || || 40,812 ||49–70
|- align="center" bgcolor="bbffbb"
| 120 || August 17 || Cubs || 4–1 ||  ||  || || 23,420 ||50–70
|- align="center" bgcolor="bbffbb"
| 121 || August 18 || Cubs || 6–3 ||  ||  || || 19,814 ||51–70
|- align="center" bgcolor="ffbbbb"
| 122 || August 19 || Cubs || 7–1 ||  ||  || || 18,012 ||51–71
|- align="center" bgcolor="ffbbbb"
| 123 || August 20 || Cardinals || 5–1 ||  ||  || || 19,867 ||51–72
|- align="center" bgcolor="bbffbb"
| 124 || August 21 || Cardinals || 4–0 ||  ||  || || 27,282 ||52–72
|- align="center" bgcolor="ffbbbb"
| 125 || August 22 || Cardinals || 7–0 ||  ||  || || 38,156 ||52–73
|- align="center" bgcolor="ffbbbb"
| 126 || August 23 || Cardinals || 5–2 ||  ||  || || 27,435 ||52–74
|- align="center" bgcolor="bbffbb"
| 127 || August 25 || @ Braves || 2–1 (12) ||  ||  || || 15,389 ||53–74
|- align="center" bgcolor="bbffbb"
| 128 || August 26 || @ Braves || 12–5 ||  ||  || || 15,619 ||54–74
|- align="center" bgcolor="ffbbbb"
| 129 || August 27 || @ Braves || 9–1 ||  ||  || || 18,651 ||54–75
|- align="center" bgcolor="bbffbb"
| 130 || August 28 || @ Marlins || 9–5 ||  ||  || || 14,402 ||55–75
|- align="center" bgcolor="bbffbb"
| 131 || August 29 || @ Marlins || 7–4 ||  ||  || || 20,924 ||56–75
|- align="center" bgcolor="ffbbbb"
| 132 || August 30 || @ Marlins || 6–4 ||  ||  || || 12,873 ||56–76
|- align="center" bgcolor="bbffbb"
| 133 || August 31 || Nationals || 3–1 ||  ||  || || 19,867 ||57–76
|-

|-  bgcolor="ffbbbb"
|- align="center" bgcolor="bbffbb"
| 134 || September 1 || Nationals || 4–1 ||  ||  || || 15,131 ||58–76
|- align="center" bgcolor="bbffbb"
| 135 || September 2 || Nationals || 7–0 ||  ||  || || 14,468 ||59–76
|- align="center" bgcolor="bbffbb"
| 136 || September 4 || @ Dodgers || 2–0 ||  ||  || || 52,965 ||60–76
|- align="center" bgcolor="ffbbbb"
| 137 || September 5 || @ Dodgers || 7–4 ||  ||  || || 53,368 ||60–77
|- align="center" bgcolor="bbffbb"
| 138 || September 6 || @ Dodgers || 4–3 ||  ||  || || 47,528 ||61–77
|- align="center" bgcolor="ffbbbb"
| 139 || September 7 || @ Giants || 9–4 ||  ||  || || 37,132 ||61–78
|- align="center" bgcolor="bbffbb"
| 140 || September 8 || @ Giants || 4–3 ||  ||  || || 34,524 ||62–78
|- align="center" bgcolor="bbffbb"
| 141 || September 9 || @ Giants || 4–2 ||  ||  || || 30,312 ||63–78
|- align="center" bgcolor="ffbbbb"
| 142 || September 11 || Rockies || 4–1 ||  ||  || || 18,022 ||63–79
|- align="center" bgcolor="bbffbb"
| 143 || September 12 || Rockies || 3–2 (10) ||  ||  || || 19,897 ||64–79
|- align="center" bgcolor="bbffbb"
| 144 || September 13 || Rockies || 7–3 ||  ||  || || 19,739 ||65–79
|- align="center" bgcolor="ffbbbb"
| 145 || September 14 || Diamondbacks || 4–2 (10) ||  ||  || || 20,265 ||65–80
|- align="center" bgcolor="ffbbbb"
| 146 || September 15 || Diamondbacks || 4–2 ||  ||  || || 14,790 ||65–81
|- align="center" bgcolor="bbffbb"
| 147 || September 16 || Diamondbacks || 6–5 (10) ||  ||  || || 14,377 ||66–81
|- align="center" bgcolor="ffbbbb"
| 148 || September 18 || @ Pirates || 5–1 ||  ||  || || 26,178 ||66–82
|- align="center" bgcolor="bbffbb"
| 149 || September 19 || @ Pirates || 2–1 ||  ||  || || 20,379 ||67–82
|- align="center" bgcolor="bbffbb"
| 150 || September 20 || @ Pirates || 4–0 ||  ||  || || 24,028 ||68–82
|- align="center" bgcolor="bbffbb"
| 151 || September 21 || @ Pirates || 11–6 (11) ||  ||  || || 12,566 ||69–82
|- align="center" bgcolor="ffbbbb"
| 152 || September 22 || @ Rockies || 11–10 ||  ||  || || 30,695 ||69–83
|- align="center" bgcolor="bbffbb"
| 153 || September 23 || @ Rockies || 6–3 ||  ||  || || 29,597 ||70–83
|- align="center" bgcolor="bbffbb"
| 154 || September 24 || @ Rockies || 5–4 ||  ||  || || 37,049 ||71–83
|- align="center" bgcolor="bbffbb"
| 155 || September 25 || @ Diamondbacks || 4–0 ||  ||  || || 29,731 ||72–83
|- align="center" bgcolor="ffbbbb"
| 156 || September 26 || @ Diamondbacks || 8–5 ||  ||  || || 39,326 ||72–84
|- align="center" bgcolor="ffbbbb"
| 157 || September 27 || @ Diamondbacks || 7–4 ||  ||  || || 30,017 ||72–85
|- align="center" bgcolor="bbffbb"
| 158 || September 29 || Dodgers || 3–1 ||  ||  || || 25,318 ||73–85
|- align="center" bgcolor="bbffbb"
| 159 || September 30 || Dodgers || 5–0 ||  ||  || || 25,469 ||74–85
|- align="center" bgcolor="ffbbbb"
| 160 || October 2 || Giants || 7–2 ||  ||  || || 26,776 ||74–86
|- align="center" bgcolor="bbffbb"
| 161 || October 3 || Giants || 2–0 ||  ||  || || 25,732 ||75–86
|- align="center" bgcolor="ffbbbb"
| 162 || October 4 || Giants || 4–3 (10) ||  ||  || || 25,082 ||75–87
|-

Player stats

Batting
Note: G = Games played; AB = At bats; R = Runs scored; H = Hits; 2B = Doubles; 3B = Triples; HR = Home runs; RBI = Runs batted in; AVG = Batting average; SB = Stolen bases

Pitching
Note: W = Wins; L = Losses; ERA = Earned run average; G = Games pitched; GS = Games started; SV = Saves; IP = Innings pitched; R = Runs allowed; ER = Earned runs allowed; BB = Walks allowed; K = Strikeouts

Farm system

LEAGUE CHAMPIONS: Fort Wayne

References

External links
2009 San Diego Padres season at Baseball Reference
2009 San Diego Padres season Official Site (Archived 2009-08-14)

San Diego Padres seasons
San Diego Padres
San Diego